Pirom Un-Prasert (born 16 November 1953) is a retired international football referee from Thailand. He is best known for refereeing the 1997 FIFA Confederations Cup Final and two matches in the 1998 FIFA World Cup in France; the Norway-Morocco and Paraguay-Nigeria matches in the first round. He also officiated at the 1995 FIFA Women's World Cup, the 1996 Olympic tournament in Atlanta, the 1996 AFC Asian Cup, and eight matches in 1998 World Cup qualifiers.

References

Football Database Profile
Profile

1953 births
Living people
Pirom Un-prasert
FIFA Women's World Cup referees
FIFA World Cup referees
1998 FIFA World Cup referees
Olympic football referees
AFC Asian Cup referees